Rule of Law Initiative may refer to:

Presidential Rule of Law Initiative, project between the U.S. and China to expand bilateral cooperation in the field of law
ABA Rule of Law Initiative, American Bar Association's overseas rule of law programs